was a professional wrestling event promoted by World Wonder Ring Stardom. The event took place on September 25, 2022, in Tokyo at the Belle Salle Takadanobaba with a limited attendance due in part to the ongoing COVID-19 pandemic at the time.

Background
The Stardom in Showcase is a series of pay-per-views which mainly focuses on a diversity of gimmick matches, only different from the singles match stipulation. Billed as respiro shows, the main tagline of these events is "Anything can happen".

The show featured six professional wrestling matches that resulted from scripted storylines, where wrestlers portrayed villains, heroes, or less distinguishable characters in the scripted events that built tension and culminated in a wrestling match or series of matches.

Event
The first match presented Hanan defeating Saya Iida in one of the Stardom 5 Star Grand Prix 2022 league matches in which the Future of Stardom Champion picked up a win over her Stars stablemate to score her second win in the tournament. The match was in the preshow and was broadcast live on Stardom's YouTube channel. DJ Pretty Dragon was presented to be the night's music player and Saya Kamitani who main evented the previous Showcase event joined the commentary table. The second match of the night saw Prominence's Suzu Suzuki picking a victory over Starlight Kid in another 5 Star Grand Prix match, granting Suzuki another two points in the Blue Block. After the second match, Saya Iida won a posing contest between herself, Thekla, Momo Kohgo, Syuri, Mirai, Hazuki, Waka Tsukiyama, and Giulia. In the third match, Ram Kaicho defeated the High Speed Champion AZM, the SWA World Champion Mayu Iwatani, and Maika in a four-way falls count anywhere match. The bout was one of the comedic confrontations of the event, taking place mainly outside of the ring, on the venue's staircase, or inside an inflatable doll. Various items were used, such as a bicycle ridden by Maika on the aisle. The fourth bout was the second comedic match of the night, where the members of the Cosmic Angels stable had their usual cosmic rule confrontation. The match saw the wrestlers competing summarily dressed and using various items such as water guns. The match ended in disqualification by referee Daichi Murayama after Unagi Sayaka collected all of her opponents' bras. Unagi then tries to take referee Daichi Murayama’s shirt off. Everyone else declared the winners. The fifth match saw Donna Del Mondo's leader Giulia teaming up with the time's GCW Ultraviolent Champion Rina Yamashita in a hardcore tag team match where they defeated Momo Watanabe & Ruaka. Various items such as roof tiles, chairs, ladders, a guitar, and a table impaled by cut metal cans were used.

The main event saw Yuu & Nanae Takahashi alongside Yuna Manase who were the two reaper masks defeating Syuri, Utami Hayashishita & Lady C. Takahashi & Yuu confirmed their team for the 2022 edition of the Goddesses of Stardom Tag League. Minutes later, a video of Alpha Female is played, along with Nanae Takahashi and criticizing the current situation in Stardom. Together with Takahashi, Manase & Yuu, Alpha Female officially formed the "Neo Stardom Army" unit and declared the destruction over Stardom's roster.

Results

Notes

References

External links
Page Stardom World

2022 in professional wrestling
World Wonder Ring Stardom shows
Professional wrestling in Tokyo
Women's professional wrestling shows
World Wonder Ring Stardom